The Legend of Mike Smith is a 2013 album by Soweto Kinch.

Track listing
All tracks are written by Soweto Kinch.  CD2 starts from track 22.

 "The Phone Call" (2:22)
 "A Restless Mind" (3:32)
 "The Great Commission" (0:16)
 "The Dream" (7:11)
 "Proactive Training" (1:52)
 "Acedia" (6:48)
 "Buzzy's Coattails" (2:03)
 "Invidia" (4:40)
 "Pick Up the Phone" (0:37)
 "Road Block" (6:45)
 "Tube Delays" (0:16)
 "Traffic Lights" (4:27)
 "Pressure" (6:06)
 "Serpent's Tail" (0:47)
 "Ira" (5:03)
 "Concierge" (1:16)
 "Vacuum" (8:33)
 "Shopping Spree" (0:30)
 "Sweeping Change" (7:52)
 "Lord of the Flies" (0:37)
 "Gula" (6:34)
 "Escape the Vomitorium" (1:23)
 "Luxuria" (6:04)
 "Not Smooth Sir" (0:39)
 "The Board Game" (4:52)
 "Play Again" (0:39)
 "Avaritia" (6:41)
 "Roma" (0:46)
 "Slam" (2:15)
 "Shut Out the Voices" (0:55)
 "Better Off Alone" (5:37)
 "Razor Calls" (1:15)
 "Superbia" (6:49)
 "The Dark Warrior Lord" (1:30)
 "D'urge" (5:48)
 "Man's Darkest Hour" (0:53)
 "Epiphany" (7:09)
 "I'm Going Anyway" (1:43)
 "The Healing" (5:13)
 "The Golden Mic" (1:10)
 "The Bounce" (5:38)

Personnel
 Soweto Kinch – rap vocals, alto saxophone (1, 4, 8, 10, 17, 19, 25, 29, 35, 39, 41), tenor saxophone (6, 8, 12, 21, 25, 31, 37), Fender Rhodes (39), All beats/programming
 Shabaka Hutchings – tenor saxophone (2, 10, 29, 35, 39, 41), clarinet (4, 33)
 Karl Rasheed-Abel – all live double bass
 Graham Godfrey – all live drums
 Julian Joseph – vocals (17, 19)
 Cleveland Watkiss – vocals (27)
 Eska Mtungwazi – vocals (12, 31)
 Rachel Maby – vocals (37, all interludes)
The cast
 Mike Smith: Toyin Omari-Kinch
 Mike's inner thoughts: Soweto Kinch
 The Sage: Jonathan Owen
 Kate Advo (A+R): Tessa Walker
 Muse 1: Yvette Harris
 Muse 2: Jonzi D
 The Choir: Rachel Maby
 Buzzy Sparxx: Dominic 'Silverchet' Davids
 Taxi Driver: Joel Cottrell
 Police Man in 'Pressure': Tony Platt
 Bajan Tube Announcer: Jonzi D
 Concierge: David Timothy
 Waitress: Iza Korsak
 Jada: Terri Facey
 Jenni Mimi Fresh
 Dark Angel: Tyrone Huggins
 Amusement Arcade Worker: Jonzi D
 Kaos: Tony "Jamo" Morrison
 Cynthia: Janine Small
 Razor Sharp: Daniel Anderson

References

2013 albums
Soweto Kinch albums